Actinoschoenus is a genus of the sedge family, which includes around five species native to Australia.

Actinoschoenus arthrostyloides (W.Fitzg.) K.L.Clarke, K.L.Wilson & J.J.Bruhl	
Actinoschoenus glabrispiculus Rye, R.L.Barrett & M.D.Barrett
Actinoschoenus pentagonus Rye, R.L.Barrett & M.D.Barrett
Actinoschoenus quadricostatus Rye, R.L.Barrett & M.D.Barrett
Actinoschoenus ramosus Rye, R.L.Barrett & M.D.Barrett

References

 
Cyperaceae genera